The 1975–76 FA Cup was the 95th staging of the world's oldest football knockout competition, The Football Association Challenge Cup, or FA Cup.  The final saw 2nd tier Southampton beat Manchester United 1–0, with the only goal coming from Bobby Stokes in the 83rd minute of the game.

First round proper

Teams from the Football League Third and Fourth Division entered in this round plus Matlock Town, Scarborough, Wigan Athletic and Altrincham were given byes. The first round of games were played on 22 November 1975. Replays were played mainly on the 24th–26th, with second replays performed one or two weeks after.

Second round proper
The second round of games were played on 13 December 1975. Replays took place on the 15th–17th or the 22nd.

Third round proper
Teams from the Football League First and Second Division entered in this round. The third round of games in the FA Cup were mainly played on 3 January 1976, with two matches played two days earlier on New Year's Day. Replays were mainly played midweek over 6–7 January or the week after but one occurred on the 24th instead. Holders West Ham United were eliminated by Liverpool.

Fourth round proper
The fourth round of games were mostly played on 28 January 1976, with three replays and a main tie on the 27th and 28th. One of the main ties was played on 2 February instead.

Fifth round proper
The fifth set of games took place (except for one game) on 14 February 1976. Three games went to a replay which were played on 17–18 February. The Norwich City–Bradford City match and a second replay of the Bolton Wanderers–Newcastle United match were played on 23 February.

Sixth round proper
The sixth round of FA Cup games were played on 6 March 1976. There was one replay on the 9th.

Semi finals

Final

TV Coverage
The right to show FA Cup games were, as with Football League matches, shared between the BBC and ITV network. All games were shown in a highlights format, except the Final, which was shown live both on BBC1 & ITV. The BBC football highlights programme Match of the Day would show up to three games and the various ITV regional network stations would cover up to one game and show highlights from other games covered elsewhere on the ITV network. No games from Rounds 1 or 2 were shown. Highlights of replays would be shown on either the BBC or ITV.

One Fifth Round tie that was picked to be shown by ITV was postponed This was Norwich City v Bradford City (Anglia & Yorkshire) 

Third Round 
BBC West Ham United v Liverpool, Scarborough v Crystal Palace, Queens Park Rangers v Newcastle United, Newcastle United v Queens Park Rangers (Midweek replay), Stoke City v Tottenham Hotspur (Saturday Replay).
 
ITV 
Derby County v Everton (ATV & Granada), Tottenham Hotspur v Stoke City (LWT), Leicester City v Sheffield United (Yorkshire out of region) Other regions showed those three games.
 
Fourth Round 
BBC Coventry City v Newcastle United, Manchester United v Peterborough United.
 
ITV 
Derby County v Liverpool (ATV & Granada), Leeds United v Crystal Palace (Yorkshire), Norwich City v Luton Town (Anglia), Charlton Athletic v Portsmouth (LWT & Southern), Stoke City v Manchester City (Midweek All regions).
 
Fifth Round 
BBC Chelsea v Crystal Palace, Bolton Wanderers v Newcastle United, Wolverhampton Wanderers v Charlton Athletic, Newcastle United v Bolton Wanderers (Midweek Both replays).
 
ITV Leicester City v Manchester United (ATV & Granada), Stoke City v Sunderland (Tyne-Tees Out of region), Derby County v Southend United (Anglia & LWT Out of Region).

Sixth Round 
BBC Derby County v Newcastle United, Bradford City v Southampton.
 
ITV Sunderland v Crystal Palace (Tyne-Tees & LWT), Manchester United v Wolverhampton Wanderers (Granada & ATV), Wolverhampton Wanderers v Manchester United (Midweek replay All regions).
 
Semi-Finals 
BBC Derby County v Manchester United.
 
ITV Crystal Palace v Southampton (All regions).
 
Final 
Manchester United v Southampton covered Live by BBC & ITV.

References
 FA Cup Results Archive

 
FA Cup seasons
Fa
Eng